Toad's Place is a concert venue and nightclub located in New Haven, Connecticut.

History
The building, located on York Street down the street from Ashley's Ice Cream and across an alley from Mory's Temple Bar, was the original location of the Yale Co-op. During the 1960s, it was a popular restaurant called Hungry Charlie's and then the location of Caleb's Tavern. In 1974, Michael Spoerndle, formerly a student at the Culinary Institute of America, rented the building for a French and Italian restaurant, which opened in March 1975. He named it Toad's Place, after a childhood joke. He said, "When my parents were going out to dinner, they would tell me they were going to such-and-such, and I thought it would be funny if they said, 'We're going to Toad's Place.' Plus, people who didn't go out and stayed at home, we'd call them 'toads.' It was the equivalent of a couch potato." In 1976, Spoerndle turned the restaurant into a live music venue, working with a local musician named Peter Menta to bring in bands. Willie Dixon, Muddy Waters, John Lee Hooker and Koko Taylor were some of the first performers. In 1976, Brian Phelps joined as manager and eventually co-owner. Phelps took control in 1995, after Spoerndle's numerous problems with alcohol and drug addiction. Spoerndle died on May 6, 2011.

In 1983, a second location opened in Waterbury, Connecticut, although it lasted only three years. In 2007, a franchise location in Richmond, Virginia opened with a concert by the Squirrel Nut Zippers. It included a restaurant and club for up to 1,500 visitors. The principal owner was Charles Joyner, a local physician who was a disc jockey at Toad's Place while he was a Yale undergraduate in the 1980s. On 9 March 2009, Toad's Place Richmond was closed. All scheduled shows were canceled and/or moved to The National, another venue in Richmond. A third location was planned for Trenton, New Jersey.

Jeff Lorber, a jazz keyboardist, included an instrumental piece called Toad's Place on his album Water Sign. Through mutual friends, singer Rob Zombie met future wife, actress Sheri Moon, at Toad's in 1989. They married on Halloween of 2002.

Notable concerts

Incidents with under-age drinking
In September 2002, Toad's Place was fined $25,000 and closed for a week after underage drinkers were found on the premises. In May 2007, it closed for ninety days, after a November 5, 2005 inspection by the state Liquor Control Commission found 142 underage drinkers were present. The owner paid a fine of $90,000 in addition to the ninety-day closure. It reopened on August 4, 2007 with a concert by Badfish, a Sublime tribute band.

References

External links
Toad's Place New Haven

Music venues in Connecticut
Tourist attractions in New Haven, Connecticut
Nightclubs in the United States
Rock music venues
Buildings and structures in New Haven, Connecticut
Economy of New Haven, Connecticut